A. Scott Frank (born March 10, 1960) is an American film director, producer, screenwriter, and author. Frank has received two Academy Award nominations for Best Adapted Screenplay for Out of Sight (1998) and Logan (2017). His film work, credited and uncredited, extends to dozens of films. In recent years, he has worked for Netflix on television miniseries, most prominently writing and directing The Queen's Gambit.

Early life and education 
Frank was born to a Jewish family in Fort Walton Beach, Florida, on March 10, 1960. His family moved to Los Gatos, California where he went to high school. He attended the University of California, Santa Barbara, graduating in 1982 with a Bachelor of Arts in film studies.

Career 
While a student at the University of California, Frank first had the idea for what would become the script for Little Man Tate in 1981, thinking that, in the aftermath of the Iran hostage crisis that there was "a slight petulance to world events at the time" and envisioning "an eight year old who was making more sense of the world than Ted Koppel." After graduation he worked as a bartender while attempting to sell the script, which eventually led to him getting an agent, and subsequently being hired by Paramount Pictures in 1984. It would take several years before the script was made, with Frank's first produced screenwriting work in the meantime being the 1987 film Plain Clothes, which he would later describe as "terrible." Little Man Tate was ultimately made in 1991 as the directorial debut of actress Jodie Foster.

In the years to follow, Frank's filmography included scripts for Dead Again, Malice, Heaven's Prisoners, and Get Shorty. The latter earned him his first award nominations with both the Writers Guild and the Golden Globes. He credited the success of Get Shorty with reviving his interest in the job after a bad experience on Malice, and was particularly pleased as a longtime fan of Elmore Leonard's novels that he felt had not received satisfactory film adaptations previously. This success led to his being asked to work on another Elmore Leonard adaptation, Steven Soderbergh's 1998 film Out of Sight starring George Clooney and Jennifer Lopez. The film was not a commercial success, but earned enormous critical plaudits. Frank won both the Writers Guild of America Award for Best Adapted Screenplay and the Edgar Award from the Mystery Writers of America, and was nominated for the Academy Award for Best Adapted Screenplay.

Frank was recruited by Steven Spielberg to work on the script for Minority Report, a Philip K. Dick adaptation, which he would later say was "a very difficult screenplay to write because it was loaded with so much technical detail." He performed second unit directing duties for one segment of the film, an area of filmmaking he had contemplated moving into for some time. Minority Report earned him the Saturn Award for Best Writing and several other nominations, including for Hugo and Nebula awards. Other credits from this period included The Interpreter and Marley & Me, the latter described as a film he would not have imagined himself working on but which he developed "a big soft spot for."  By 2012, Frank had worked on at least 40 films, including uncredited rewrites on films such as Saving Private Ryan, Entrapment and Dawn of the Dead.

In 2007, Frank made his directorial debut on The Lookout, a script he had started work on in 1998 and which was originally meant to be directed by Sam Mendes, who eventually departed the project to make Road to Perdition while encouraging Frank to take on the task himself. He had also attempted to recruit Sydney Pollack, the director of The Interpreter whom he considered a mentor, to direct the project. He won the Independent Spirit Award for Best First Feature for his work on the film. His second film as a director, 2014's A Walk Among the Tombstones, had a more mixed reception. In January 2016, Frank published his first novel, Shaker, a crime mystery published by Penguin Random House. He also worked in the burgeoning superhero genre for the first time, making two films with director James Mangold, The Wolverine (2013) and Logan (2017). For the latter, he received his second Academy Award nomination.

Having had some previous experience working for network television Frank had begun to develop Godless, previously intended as a film, into a miniseries for HBO. However, Netflix outbid HBO for the project, which Frank both wrote and directed. The miniseries earned Frank numerous award nominations, including from the Directors Guild and three Primetime Emmy Awards. The success of Godless led Frank to pitch further projects to Netflix, several of which were rejected, until they expressed interest in The Queen's Gambit, an adaptation of a Walter Tevis novel that Frank had previously attempted to make as a film. Frank said that he viewed the novel as exploring "the cost of genius", a theme that he had first intended to explore in Little Man Tate but "didn't quite get there with it."

Frank won the 2021 Emmy for Outstanding Directing for a Limited or Anthology Series or Movie.

Filmography

Film 
Screenwriter

Director

Producer

Television

Awards and nominations

References

External links 
 

1960 births
Living people
20th-century American Jews
20th-century American male writers
20th-century American screenwriters
21st-century American Jews
21st-century American male writers
21st-century American screenwriters
AFI Conservatory alumni
American male screenwriters
American television directors
American television writers
American male television writers
Edgar Award winners
Film directors from Florida
People from Fort Walton Beach, Florida
Screenwriters from Florida
University of California, Santa Barbara alumni
Writers Guild of America Award winners